Stellan Wahlström Drift Band is a rock band from Stockholm, Sweden. The singer and songwriter Stellan Wahlström previously played with The Wylde Mammoths who released records on the American label Crypt Records and toured in Europe and in the USA. During the late 1990s the first album Time Leaves You Behind was recorded in New York by Patrick Derivaz (who had previously worked with John Cale, Luna and Television among others) followed by live shows at clubs like CBGB's, Sidewalk and Continental. The song "Watching TV" was featured in the independent film Rhimes and Reason. Wahlström has also played in England and toured in India. Back in Stockholm the band has made four more albums released by Belpid Records.

Members
Stellan Wahlström - vocals, guitars
Johan Werner - guitars, piano, organ
Johan Adelman - bass
Johan Svahn - drums
Mats Grönmark - guitar

Discography

Albums
1999 - Time leaves you behind
2005 - The excitable gift
2009 - Across the room
2015 - Hotel Continental
2022 - As real as in a dream

Singles & EPs
1991 - Gör det fort (7" vinyl)
1994 - Går igen (EP)
2001 - So this is what the end looks like (EP)
2004 - Ocean Ave
2005 - Further away from you
2009 - Charlotte says
2010 - Burn baby burn / Good Friday
2015 - The mercy
2021 - Into the light
2022 - Through the alleys, across the squares

Compilations
2000 - Sinderella sampler 00/01
2004 - Indeed a very friendly Belpid compilation
2008 - An utmost friendly Belpid compilation

References

 Discogs
 [ All Music Guide]

External links
 Record label
 MySpace

Swedish rock music groups
Musical groups established in 1990